Fremont Senior High (FHS) is the sole public high school for the city of Fremont, Nebraska, United States. FHS operates grades 9–12; its enrollment for the 2018–19 academic year was 1487 students. The school's athletic teams are the Tigers and its colors are black and gold.

Athletics
The Tigers compete in the Heartland Conference in the following sports:

Baseball
Basketball (boys and girls)
Bowling
Cross Country (boys and girls)
Football
Golf (boys and girls)
Soccer (boys and girls)
Softball
Swimming 
Tennis (boys and girls)
Track and Field (boys and girls)
Volleyball
Wrestling

Alumni
 Gerry Gdowski (1986), football quarterback for the University of Nebraska, college football coach, Fremont High School Valedictorian.
 Sue Bierman (1942), Fremont High School Valedictorian, Civic Leader, San Francisco,
 Thomas M. Carsey, Professor of Political Science
 Richard A. Jensen (1953), theologian 
 Ben Sasse (1990), U.S. Senator from Nebraska and former president of Midland University
 Jessica Shepard, Notre Dame Women's Basketball, WNBA (Minnesota Lynx)

References

External links
 School website

Public high schools in Nebraska
Fremont, Nebraska
Schools in Dodge County, Nebraska